Sycamore Township is a township in Butler County, Kansas, USA.  As of the 2000 census, its population was 333.

History
Sycamore Township was organized in 1871. It was named for a large sycamore tree which has long since blown over.

Geography
According to the USGS, it contains one cemetery, Cassoday. The stream of School Branch runs through this township.

Further reading

References

External links
 Butler County Website
 City-Data.com
 Butler County Maps: Current, 1936

Townships in Butler County, Kansas
Townships in Kansas